The Northern Territory Minister for Police, Fire and Emergency Services is a Minister of the Crown in the Government of the Northern Territory.

The Minister is responsible for police, emergency services, volunteer emergency management, fire and rescue services, volunteer fire and rescue management, and oversees the Northern Territory Police.

The current minister is Michael Gunner (Labor). He was sworn in on 31 August 2016 following the Labor victory at the 2016 election.

Ministers for Police, Fire and Emergency Services

References

Northern Territory-related lists
Ministers of the Northern Territory government
Northern Territory